Kralingse Zoom is a subway station on lines A, B, and C of the Rotterdam Metro, in the Kralingen neighbourhood of eastern Rotterdam. The station is located just west of the A16 motorway on the east side of Kralingse Zoom, the road it is named after. At Kralingse Zoom station, transfer is available to several bus lines, as well as to the ParkShuttle, a people mover to a nearby business district.

Kralingse Zoom is an above-ground station and is located just to the east of the metro tunnel in which the trains cross the city center. The station has two centre platforms, each with two tracks running alongside them. For most of the day, only the inner two tracks are used.

Kralingse Zoom is the metro stop to get to the Erasmus University and to the University of Applied Sciences (Economic Studies).

References

External links

www.eur.nl

www.hr.nl

Rotterdam Metro stations